Jerry Moyes is the Founder, and former Chairman and CEO of Phoenix-based Swift Transportation, one of the largest trucking companies in the United States. Moyes is also owner of charter airline Swift Air and FBO Swift Aviation at Phoenix Sky Harbor International Airport. Moyes is the controlling owner of SME Steel Contractors Inc., a steel erector company based in Utah, and Texas-based LTL freight carrier Central Freight Lines. He was a majority owner of the Phoenix Coyotes of the National Hockey League before the Coyotes filed bankruptcy and were sold to the NHL in 2009, and the Arizona Sting of the National Lacrosse League. Moyes is also a limited partner in the Arizona Diamondbacks, and was once a minority owner of the Phoenix Suns.

A graduate of Weber State College, Moyes previously served as president of the Arizona Motor Transport Association.

Near the end of 2016, Moyes announced he would retire at the end of the year.

Moyes and his wife Vickie have been married for over 50 years and have 10 children and 10 grandchildren.

Phoenix Coyotes
Moyes was originally a minority partner in Steve Ellman's ownership group, which bought the Coyotes from Richard Burke in 2001. On Sept. 26, 2006, Ellman sold controlling interest in the Coyotes, Arizona Sting, and the lease to Jobing.com Arena to Moyes, who retained Wayne Gretzky as part-owner and head of hockey operations.

Court filings showed Moyes was never keen to own the Coyotes and had no interest in hockey. He acquired control of the club in 2006 after a falling out over a real estate development with former business partner Steve Ellman. Afterwards, Moyes tried to find a buyer for the Coyotes, and he chafed at the league's interference in his attempts. In 2008, Moyes told Gary Bettman and other league officials that he would stop funding the club. The league agreed to provide emergency funding in return for Moyes ceding his voting control. The acrimony was made public in May 2009 when Bettman and Daly came close to selling the Coyotes to Jerry Reinsdorf, owner of the Chicago Bulls and Chicago White Sox, a move that would have seen Moyes receive almost nothing from the sale. On May 5, 2009, Moyes put the Coyotes into Chapter 11 bankruptcy protection and announced a plan to sell the club to Jim Balsillie. Moyes also filed a lawsuit against the NHL, alleging the league was an "illegal cartel." Bettman was furious, arguing the league had been blindsided and that Moyes had no authority to put the club into bankruptcy protection.

Moyes was saddled with massive financial losses dating to the time the former Winnipeg Jets moved to Phoenix.  Unable to turn around the team's fiscal picture, he agreed in principle to sell the Coyotes to a group headed by Research in Motion co-CEO Jim Balsillie, who intended to move the team to Hamilton, Ontario.  The league responded by stripping Moyes of virtually all of his ownership authority, though he was still nominally the team's owner.  The NHL argued that Moyes had no right to file because numerous agreements he'd signed with the league in return for financial assistance specifically barred him from filing for bankruptcy.  It also claimed that Moyes effectively surrendered control of the team by signing the agreements.  Bankruptcy judge Redfield Baum scheduled a hearing for May 19, 2009 to determine who actually controlled the team.  In October 2009, Baum rejected the NHLs bid, as well as Balsillie's $242.5-million offer. The judge ruled that Balsillie's bid faced too many legal obstacles, however, he said the NHL could revise its bid to include concessions to Moyes and Gretzky. The NHL had originally taken the position that neither Moyes nor Gretzky were legitimate creditors because they were owners. Under Chapter 11 proceedings, owners usually rank below other creditors and rarely receive any of the proceeds from asset sales. On November 2, 2009, Moyes sold the Coyotes to the NHL for $140 million.

References

External links
 Jerry Moyes on Phoenix Coyotes website

American sports businesspeople
American trucking industry businesspeople
Arizona Coyotes owners
National Hockey League executives
National Hockey League owners
Living people
Weber State University alumni
Year of birth missing (living people)